The Interstate Highways in North Dakota are the segments of the Dwight D. Eisenhower National System of Interstate and Defense Highways owned and maintained by the North Dakota Department of Transportation (NDDOT) in the US state of North Dakota.


Mainline highways

Business routes

See also

References

External links

 
Interstate